Laura Dundovic (born 16 September 1987 in Sydney, Australia) is an Australian actress, model and beauty pageant titleholder who won Miss Universe Australia 2008 and represented Australia in the Miss Universe 2008 competition, in which she placed in the top 10.  She also took part in the Australian version of I'm A Celebrity Get Me Out Of Here.

Dundovic supports the Western Sydney Wanderers in the A-League and supported Sydney United, club founded by Australian Croats; her brother played youth football for Northern Spirit.

References

External links

1987 births
Living people
Australian people of Maltese descent
Australian female models
Models from Sydney
Australian people of Croatian descent
Australian beauty pageant winners
Miss Universe Australia winners
I'm a Celebrity...Get Me Out of Here! (Australian TV series) participants
Miss Universe 2008 contestants